A sheriffdom is a judicial district of Scotland. Originally identical to the   Shires of Scotland, from the eighteenth century many counties were grouped to form "sheriffdoms".

By 1975 there were 12 sheriffdoms, with only Lanarkshire not grouped with another county. Following the abolition of the counties and formation of new local government areas in 1975 and 1996 the number of sheriffdoms has been reduced to six.

Shires originated in the twelfth century when the office of sheriff was introduced to Scotland. These shires eventually became the counties of Scotland. Malcolm III appears to have introduced sheriffs as part of a policy of replacing Gaelic forms of government with Norman feudal structures. This was continued by his sons Edgar, Alexander I and in particular David I. David completed the division of the country into sheriffdoms by the conversion of existing thanedoms.

The ending of heritable jurisdictions
At the accession of George II in 1727 twenty-two sheriffs were hereditary, three were appointed for life and only eight held office at the pleasure of the monarch.

The heritable sheriffdoms were: 

Argyll
Bute
Banff
Caithness
Clackmannan
Cromarty
Dumbarton
Dumfries

Elgin
Fife
Kinross
Kirkcudbright
Linlithgow
Nairn
Orkney and Zetland

Peebles
Renfrew
Roxburgh
Selkirk
Sutherland
Stirling
Wigtown

Those appointed for life were: 

Perth

Forfar

Ayr

Those held at pleasure were:

Aberdeen
Berwick
Edinburgh

Haddington
Inverness
Kincardine

Lanark 
Ross

Following the unsuccessful Jacobite Rising of 1745 the Heritable Jurisdictions Act 1747 revested the government of the shires in the Crown, compensating those office holders who were displaced. The Sheriffs (Scotland) Act 1747 reduced the office of sheriff principal to a largely ceremonial one, with a sheriff depute or sheriff substitute appointed to each "county, shire or stewartry".   The sheriff deputes, who were paid a salary by the Crown, were qualified advocates and took charge of sheriff courts. Where a sheriff depute was appointed to more than one county, he was aided by sheriff-substitutes.

Combinations after 1747

Since 1975

Since 1 January 1975 there have been six sheriffdoms, originally defined in reference to regions, districts and islands areas which were then to be created on 16 May 1975.

The sheriffdoms of Glasgow & Strathkelvin and South Strathclyde, Dumfries & Galloway were redefined with effect from 1 April 1996, when new local government areas were created.

The six current sheriffdoms are (with Sheriffs Courts in brackets):

Glasgow and Strathkelvin - (Glasgow)
Grampian, Highland and Islands - (Aberdeen - Banff -  Elgin - Fort William - Inverness - Kirkwall - Lerwick - Lochmaddy - Peterhead - Portree - Stornoway - Tain - Wick)
Lothian and Borders - ( Edinburgh - Jedburgh - Livingston - Selkirk)
North Strathclyde - ( Campbeltown - Dumbarton - Dunoon - Greenock - Kilmarnock - Oban - Paisley)
South Strathclyde, Dumfries and Galloway - (Airdrie - Ayr - Dumfries - Hamilton - Lanark - Stranraer)
Tayside, Central and Fife - ( Alloa -  Dundee - Dunfermline - Falkirk - Forfar - Kirkcaldy - Perth - Stirling)

References

See also
Shires of Scotland
Sheriffdom

 
Legal history of Scotland
Administrative divisions of Scotland
Judiciary of Scotland